Clinton Mukoni Mata Pedro Lourenço (born 7 November 1992) is a professional footballer who plays for Club Brugge as a right back. Born in Belgium, he represents Angola at international level.

Club career

Early years
Born in Verviers, Belgium, Mata started playing football with local clubs Royal Battice, Entente Rechaintoise, Etoile Elsautoise and Visé before moving to the KAS Eupen in 2010. On 17 February 2012, he made his professional debut in a 2–1 win over Waasland-Beveren in the Belgian Second Division. Afterwards, Mata was not always in the starting eleven, first winning a regular place in the starting lineup in the second half of the 2013–14 season, where Eupen qualified as runner-up for the final round for promotion to the first Belgian league. This ended in a disappointing 2–1 defeat to OH Leuven.

Charleroi
In the summer of 2014, Mata moved to Belgian First Division A club Charleroi, where he was mainly a substitute as before in Eupen, before coming closer to a regular starting spot in the second half of the 2015–16 season. As group winners in play-off 2, Charleroi qualified for the play-off for participation in the final for qualifying for the UEFA Europa League. In the playoff match, Mata and his club beat Kortrijk, but lost in the final Europa League play-off match against Genk. The following season marked the breakthrough of Mata for Charleroi, and in August 2017 he moved to Genk on loan. Mata was part of the team qualifying for the UEFA Europa League after Zulte Waregem were beaten 2–0 in the decisive play-off game.

Club Brugge
Mata then joined the defending Belgian champions, Club Brugge, but only made his debut on the ninth matchday in the derby against Cercle Brugge due to an injury. Mata evolved into a starter for the club during his first season, where they finished runner-up in the league. He was also utilised in Club Brugge's UEFA Champions League campaign. In the following season, Mata had experienced his breakthrough when he played almost every game and won the Belgian championship with Club Brugge after the COVID-19 pandemic had resulted in the season being abandoned.

International career
In July 2014 Mata was asked to switch his international allegiance to Angola. He made his debut for Angola later that year.

Honours
Club Brugge
Belgian Pro League: 2019–20, 2020–21
Belgian Super Cup: 2018, 2021, 2022

References

1992 births
Living people
People from Verviers
Belgian people of Angolan descent
Angolan footballers
Belgian footballers
Footballers from Liège Province
Association football midfielders
Angola international footballers
Belgian Pro League players
C.S. Visé players
K.A.S. Eupen players
R. Charleroi S.C. players
K.R.C. Genk players
Club Brugge KV players